Where We Belong is the third studio album by Irish boy band Boyzone. The album was released on 25 May 1998 by Polydor Records. Five singles were released from the album, including a cover version of "I Love the Way You Love Me". The album became a top 10 album in eleven countries. It was the group's first and only album to be released in the United States, where it charted at number 167 on the Billboard 200. Where We Belong is also the third and final studio album Boyzone released before the death of Stephen Gately, 11 years later.

Background and release
Like their first two albums, much of the original material for the album was written or co-written by the band members themselves. In 1998, Ronan Keating was awarded the Ivor Novello Award for "Picture of You", which was featured as the main theme song from the film Bean (1997).

Where We Belong album was released on 25 May 1998 in the United Kingdom by Polydor Records. It topped the UK Albums Chart on the week of 6 June 1998. Five singles were released from the album: "Picture of You", "Baby Can I Hold You", "All That I Need", "No Matter What" and "I Love the Way You Love Me", with the addition of the French-language single "Te Garder Pres De Moi", which was released and included on the album exclusively in France. The original British issue of the album did not contain "No Matter What" or "I Love the Way You Love Me" - these were included on a later pressing, issued on 10 November 1998. The following week, the album was released in the United States on 17 November 1998 by Ravenous Records, a label set up by Jim Steinman under Mercury Records. The US edition included three new songs; "I'll Never Not Need You", "Walk On (So They Told Me)", and "All the Time in the World". "All the Time in the World" was released as the album's first single in the US on 5 October 1998. "No Matter What" was featured on the US edition of the soundtrack to the 1999 film Notting Hill, and was released to American radio on 10 May 1999.

Although "Picture of You" is included on the album in both the United States and Australia, it was released as a single from A Different Beat in those regions, as the release of A Different Beat occurred there after the release of "Picture of You" in the United Kingdom. The American edition of the album includes three new tracks that were not released in Britain until the release of By Request in 1999. Although "Shooting Star" was released as a double A-side with "Baby Can I Hold You" in most territories, it only appeared as a bonus track on the album in Japan. The album is also the third and final studio album that the group released before the death of Stephen Gately eleven years later.

Commercial performance
The album topped the UK Albums Chart for three weeks in 1998, on 6 June, 5 September and 12 September respectively, making it their first album to spend more than a week at number one. The album was the third best selling album of 1998 in the United Kingdom. The album was certified as 5× Platinum in the UK.

B-sides
Several B-sides were issued to the singles taken from the album. The original track "I've Got You", co-written by Graham, Hedges and Brannigan, was released alongside "Picture of You", which also included a Spanish-language version of "Words", an extended mix of its title track, and the band's Eurovision promotional single, "Let the Message Run Free", which was also released as a promotional single with cans of Pepsi. The Japanese-only bonus track "Shooting Star" was issued as the B-side to "Baby Can I Hold You", alongside the band's version of "Mystical Experience", formerly only released in America, as well as a remix of the said track, the Spanish-language version of "Words" and the classic B-side "From Here to Eternity". The Japanese-only bonus track "Never Easy" was issued as the B-side to "All That I Need, alongside A Different Beat opener "Paradise", a French-language version of "Working My Way Back to You" included as a bonus track from the album in France, and remixes of the title track by Piz Danuk and Trouser Enthusiasts. The brand new track "Where Have You Been", co-written by Keating, Hedges and Brannigan, was released alongside "No Matter What", accompanied by a remix of "All That I Need" by Phil Da Costa, the Japanese-only bonus track "She's the One" co-written by Keating, an interview with the band, and the band's former hit singles "Father and Son" and "Words". Finally, the brand new track "Waiting for You", co-written by Gately, was issued as the B-side to "I Love the Way You Love Me", alongside "Let the Message Run Free", a live version of "No Matter What" from Wembley, and a medley of songs from the musical Grease.

Track listing

Notes
 signifies a remixer
 signifies an additional producer
 signifies a vocal producer

Charts

Weekly charts

Year-end charts

End of decade charts

Certifications

Album credits

 Boyzone - Vocals, main performer
 Robbie McIntosh - Guitar
 Mike Mangini - Guitar, drum programming, producer
 James McMillan - Guitar, programming, keyboards
 Dominic Miller - Guitar
 Heff Moraes - Engineer, mixing
 Richard Niles - Arranger
 Denniz Pop - Executive Producer
 Andy Richards - Keyboards, programming
 Steve Rinkoff - Mixing
 Rudeboy - Remixing
 Robin Sellars - Mixing
 Trevor Steel - Programming, producer
 Carl Sturken - Arranger, producer
 Ren Swan - Engineer
 John Themis - Guitar
 Warren Wiebe - Vocals (background)
 Nigel Wright - Keyboards, producer
 Paul Wright - Engineer
 DJ Nastee - Guitar
 Nick Foster - Producer
 Ben Foster - Arranger
 Jeremy Wheatley - Mixing
 David Kreuger - Producer
 Eric Liljestrand - Digital editing
 Mauricio Iragorri - Mixing
 Jack Hersca - Assistant Engineer
 Fred Carlson - Guitar
 Andy Gallimore - Engineer
 Sharon Kearney - Assistant Engineer
 Jon Douglas - Producer
 Steve Mac - Piano, mixing, arranger
 Per Magnusson - Vocals (background), producer
 Alan Chez - Trumpet

 Al Hemberger - Engineer
 Baron Raymonde - Saxophone
 Tim Willis - Assistant Engineer
 Ben Allen - Guitar, Assistant Engineer
 John R. Angier - Keyboards
 Dan Vickers - Assistant Engineer
 Andrea Derby - Production Assistant
 Chris Laws - Drums, engineer, programming
 Angela Lupino - Bass, arranger
 Mark Antony - Vocals (background)
 Jamie Hart - Assistant Engineer
 Skoti-Alain Elliot - Bass, Engineer
 Keith LeBlanc - Drums
 Jim Steinman - Producer, Executive Producer
 Michael Thompson - Guitar (acoustic), Guitar (electric)
 Evan Rogers - Arranger, producer, vocals (background)
 Tom Lord-Alge - Mixing
 Chris Blair - Mastering
 Steve Booker - Keyboards
 Andy Bradfield - Remixing
 Danny G. - Keyboards
 Andy Duncan - Drums
 Rick Essig - Mastering
 Simon Franglen - Arranger, mixing, keyboards
 Paul Gendler - Guitar (acoustic)
 Scott Gordon - Engineer
 Mike Rose - Keyboards
 Mick Guzauski - Arranger
 John Holliday - Producer, Spanish guitar
 Mark Hudson - Arranger, producer
 Nick Ingman - Orchestration
 Luís Jardim - Percussion
 Stephen Lipson - Guitar, producer, mandolin
 Andrew Lloyd Webber - Producer, Executive Producer

References

1998 albums
Boyzone albums
Polydor Records albums
Albums recorded at Cheiron Studios